Exochus is a genus of ichneumon wasps in the family Ichneumonidae. There are at least 270 described species in Exochus.

See also
 List of Exochus species

References

Further reading

External links

 

Parasitic wasps